Homoeotricha is a genus of tephritid  or fruit flies in the family Tephritidae.

Species
Homoeotricha arisanica (Shiraki, 1933)
Homoeotricha atrata (Wang, 1990)
Homoeotricha brevicornis (Chen, 1938)
Homoeotricha leporis Korneyev, 1993
Homoeotricha longipennis (Shiraki, 1933)
Homoeotricha omnistellata Ito, 2011
Homoeotricha procusa (Dirlbek & Dirlbeková, 1971)

References

Tephritinae
Tephritidae genera
Diptera of Asia